Medic is role or occupation in medicine.

Medic may also refer to:

Arts, entertainment, and media
 Medic (Team Fortress 2), one of the nine playable classes in the video game
 Medic (TV series), 1950s television series
 Medics (Polish TV series), 2012 Polish television series
 Medics (UK TV series), 1990s British television series

Other uses
 Combat medic, a trained military personnel who provide treatment on the battlefield
 , ocean liner of the White Star Line
 Friedrich Kasimir Medikus, whose name as a botanist has been commonly abbreviated as either Medik. or Medic.

See also 
 
 
 Med (disambiguation)
 Medicago, a plant genus, some of which are called "medic", "medick", or "annual medic"
 Medical (disambiguation)
 "Medicate", songs
 Medication (disambiguation)
 Medicus (disambiguation)
 The Medic (disambiguation)